Canthophrys is a genus of freshwater fish in the loach family, Cobitidae. It contains the sole species Canthophrys gongota, the gongota loach, which is found in South Asia.

References

Cobitidae
Taxa named by William John Swainson
Taxa named by Francis Buchanan-Hamilton
Monotypic ray-finned fish genera
Fish of Asia